Ken or Kenneth Barnes is the name of:

Ken Barnes (writer) (1933–2015), British writer, record producer and film historian
Ken Barnes (English footballer) (1929–2010), English footballer
Ken Barnes (soldier) (1935–2009), Jamaican soldier, politician, and footballer
Sir Kenneth Barnes (1878–1957), director of the Royal Academy of Dramatic Art
Sir Kenneth Barnes (civil servant), English civil servant
Kenneth Barnes (bank robber)
Ken Barnes (Australian footballer) (born 1941), Australian rules footballer